Epicoma protrahens is a processional moth of the family Notodontidae first described by Thomas Pennington Lucas in 1890. It is found on the east coast of Australia.

References 

Thaumetopoeinae
Moths described in 1890